Lu Guang; was a Chinese landscape painter and poet during the Yuan Dynasty (1271–1368). His specific birth and death dates are not known.

Lu was born in Suzhou in the Jiangsu province. His style name was 'Jihong' (季弘) and his pseudonym was 'Tian Yousheng' (天游生). Lu's painting followed the style of Huang Gongwang and Wang Meng.

Notes

References
 Ci hai bian ji wei yuan hui (辞海编辑委员会）. Ci hai （辞海）. Shanghai: Shanghai ci shu chu ban she （上海辞书出版社）, 1979.

Year of death unknown
Yuan dynasty landscape painters
Painters from Suzhou
Year of birth unknown
13th-century Chinese painters
14th-century Chinese painters